The 2016 Suzhou Ladies Open was a professional tennis tournament played on outdoor hard courts. It was the 5th edition of the tournament and part of the 2016 ITF Women's Circuit, offering a total of $50,000 in prize money. It took place in Suzhou, China, on 17–23 October 2016.

Singles main draw entrants

Seeds 

 1 Rankings as of 10 October 2016.

Other entrants 
The following player received a wildcard into the singles main draw:
  Gai Ao
  Gao Xinyu
  Wei Zhanlan
  Xu Yifan

The following players received entry from the qualifying draw:
  Jacqueline Cako
  Lee So-ra
  Sun Xuliu
  Yuan Yue

The following players received entry by a lucky loser spot:
  Jiang Xinyu

Champions

Singles

 Chang Kai-chen def.  Wang Yafan, 4–6, 6–2, 6–1

Doubles

 Hiroko Kuwata /  Akiko Omae def.  Jacqueline Cako /  Sabina Sharipova, 6–1, 6–3

External links 
 2016 Suzhou Ladies Open at ITFtennis.com

2016 ITF Women's Circuit
2016 in Chinese tennis
2016